Berador Khasanovich Abduraimov (born May 14, 1943) is a Soviet former football player, who played for Pakhtakor for most of his football career as a striker. He is regarded as one of the best strikers and greatest football players in the history of Uzbek football.

Playing career
He started his football career in the Uzbekistan Youth football team in 1959. In the same year he began to play for the main squad of Pakhtakor in the Soviet Top League. In 1962, when he was only 19, Abduraimov became the Soviet Top League top goalscorer with 22 goals and Pakhtakor finished the season in the Soviet Top League at 6th place. In the same year he became Merited Master of Sport.

He also played for Spartak Moscow, CSKA Moscow and Meliorator Yangiyer. Abduraimov is a member of Grigory Fedotov club with 106 scored goals. In 2001 at the initiative of the Uzbekistan Football Federation and the football magazine Nash Futbol, an Uzbek goalscorers club was founded and named after him – the Club 200 of Berador Abduraimov. In all, he scored 221 goals in his career. With 358 matches for Pakhtakor he is the club's 2nd most capped player. He scored a total of 131 goals for Pakhtakor and is the 2nd best goalscorer of Pakhtakor after Gennadi Krasnitsky with 202 goals.

His son Azamat Abduraimov was also a football player, playing as a forward.

International

In 1961 he debuted for the Soviet youth football team and scored in a match against Romania.

Managing career
He started his coaching career as manager of Pakhtakor Sports school of youth players. He worked as trainer of Pakhtakor in 1987. As the coach of the Uzbekistan, he won the Asian Games 1994 in Japan.

Personal life
Berador is a grandfather of Alia Azamat Ashkenazi, American Screenwriter and Director who co-wrote a soccer documentary "Misha" directed by Brian Song in which Berador was featured as one of the characters.

Honours

Club
Pakhtakor
Soviet Top League 6th: 1962

Individual
 Soviet Top League Topscorer: 1968, 22 goals
 Soviet First League Topscorer: 1972, 34 goals
 Club 200 of Berador Abduraimov member: 221 goals
 Grigory Fedotov club member: 106 goals

Manager
 Asian Games champion: 1994

References

External links
 Berador Abduraimov, Profile at spartak.com, 
 

1943 births
Soviet footballers
Uzbekistani footballers
Soviet Union youth international footballers
Soviet football managers
Soviet Top League players
Soviet First League players
Pakhtakor Tashkent FK players
Pakhtakor Tashkent FK managers
FK Andijan managers
FK Dinamo Samarqand managers
Uzbekistani football managers
FC Spartak Moscow players
PFC CSKA Moscow players
Sportspeople from Tashkent
Living people
Association football forwards